Dr. Joann G. Elmore is a professor of medicine at the David Geffen School of Medicine, professor of Health Policy and Management at the UCLA Fielding School of Public Health Director of the UCLA National Clinician Scholars Program, the endowed chair in Health Care Delivery for The Rosalind and Arthur Gilbert Foundation, and a practicing physician . She publishes studies on diagnostic accuracy of cancer screening and medical tests in addition to AI/machine learning, using computer-aided tools to aid in the early detection process of high-risk cancers Previously, she held faculty and leadership positions at the University of Washington, Fred Hutchinson Research Center, Group Health Research Institute, Yale University and was the Associate Director and member of the National Advisory Committee for the Robert Wood Johnson Clinical Scholars Program at Yale and University of Washington. Elmore received her medical degree from the Stanford University School of Medicine, residency training in internal medicine at Yale-New Haven Hospital, with advanced epidemiology training from the Yale School of Epidemiology and Public Health and the RWJF Clinical Scholars Program. In addition, she was a RWJF generalist physician faculty scholar. Elmore is board certified in internal medicine and serves on many national and international committees. She is Editor in Chief for Adult Primary Care at Up-To-Date and enjoys seeing patients as a primary care internist and teaching clinical medicine to students and residents.

Education and career
Elmore received her M.D. from the Stanford University School of Medicine and her M.P.H. in epidemiology from Yale University. She is certified in internal medicine by the American Board of Internal Medicine and has worked as a faculty member at Yale for five years. At Yale, she trained in the Robert Wood Johnson Foundation Clinical Scholars Program. In 1995, she joined the faculty of the University of Washington. She was the head of the general internal medicine section at Harborview Medical Center from 2000 to 2010. In 2004, she was elected a member of the American Society for Clinical Investigation. In February 2018, she was named director of the UCLA National Clinician Scholars Program.

Research
Elmore has a longstanding interest in conducting research on topics such as cancer screening (in both breast and melanoma), diagnostic accuracy and technology Elmore's research programs, over the past 20 years, expands on scientific understanding of improving methods in diagnostic accuracy, including potential patient, physician, technology and system factors associated with accuracy. She has led several multi-site R01 studies evaluating diagnostic accuracy of radiologists and pathologists and continues to secure NIH awards as well as private, non-profit foundation funding. Her current studies involve describing diagnostic variability and the impact of new technology and she continues to publish major articles in cancer screening and new screening modalities, including new work into AI and machine learning. Ultimately, Elmore wants to harness technology to provide a better scientific understanding of the physician decision-making process. Elmore has made public appearances on CBS News to inform the public on diagnostic accuracy in breast cancer screening with the use of AI machine learning techniques. Elmore was also awarded for her Open Notes initiative and research to make doctor's notes more accessible to patients, to increase patient empowerment and health care transparency.

Honors and awards
 1979-1982         Deans List, San Diego State University 
 1981	            Outstanding Student Service Award, San Diego State University 
 1981	            American Heart Association Research Fellow 
 1982	            Lewis Barbato National Award Granted yearly to one student by the American College Health Association 
 1982	            Phi Beta Kappa 
 1983-1984	    Stanford Alumni Medical Student Research Scholar 
 1986-1987	    Stanford McCormick Foundation Women's Research Scholar 
 1986-1987	    American Association of University Women Scholar 
 1987	            Graduation with Distinction in Research, Stanford School of Medicine 
 1990-1992	    Robert Wood Johnson Foundation Clinical Scholar 
 1994-1999         Robert Wood Johnson Foundation Generalist Physician Faculty Scholar (awarded to only 2 researchers per medical school nationally per 4-year period) 
 1997	            Outstanding Young Woman of America, Outstanding Young Americans 
 2001-2007	    National Advisory Committee, Robert Wood Johnson Foundation Generalist Physician Faculty Scholar Program
 2004		    Elected to the American Society of Clinical Investigation
 2005		    Who's Who in Medical Sciences Education (WWMSE)
 2006-2007	    Who's Who of American Women, 25th Silver Anniversary Edition
 2008-2016	    National Advisory Committee, Robert Wood Johnson Foundation Clinical Scholars Program
 2010		    National Institute of Health Merit Awardee in recognition of dedicated service to NCI in developing and maintaining evidence-based PDQ cancer information summaries for health professionals and the public.
 2011-2017         Washington State Health Care Authority, Health Technology Clinical Committee (Member 2011 to 2015; Vice-Chair 2016)
 2014		    Elected to Membership, the Association of American Physicians
 2014		    John Q. Sherman Award for Excellence in Patient Engagement (for Open Notes)
 2017		    5th Annual Health Data Liberator Award from Academy Health. The award recognizes the Open Notes initiative that encourages health care providers to share their visit notes with patients (Elmore is an Executive Committee Member, Open Notes)
 2017		    John M. Eisenberg National Award for Career Achievement in Research (Awarded to one individual each year by the Society of General Internal Medicine)
 2020-		    Association of University Radiologists Research Academic Fellowship Advisory Board

References

External links
 Joann G. Elmore
 Elmore Research Website
 The MLCD Research Group Website
 UCLA NCSP

Living people
21st-century American women physicians
21st-century American physicians
American women epidemiologists
American epidemiologists
American internists
University of Washington faculty
Stanford University School of Medicine alumni
Yale School of Public Health alumni
Cancer researchers
Year of birth missing (living people)
Women internists